Willy Janssen (born 19 February 1960) is a Dutch former professional footballer who played as a defender.

Career
Born in Sittard, Janssen played for PSV and NAC Breda. Janssen suffered from injuries during his career.

He made 1 appearance for the Dutch national team in 1981. That game was a friendly match against Switzerland on 1 September 1981 which also saw the international debuts of Ruud Gullit, Frank Rijkaard and Wim Kieft.

Later and personal life
Janssen later worked as a software developer. His son Tim Janssen was also a professional footballer.

References

1960 births
Living people
Dutch footballers
Netherlands international footballers
PSV Eindhoven players
NAC Breda players
Eredivisie players
Eerste Divisie players
Association football defenders
People from Sittard
Footballers from Limburg (Netherlands)